is a 2017 jidaigeki Japanese film directed by Masato Harada starring Junichi Okada as Ishida Mitsunari.  The film recounts the Battle of Sekigahara, a six-hour battle in 1600 that brought an end to the Warring States era in Japanese history, as well as the political struggles that led up to it.  It is an adaptation of the 1966 novel Sekigahara by Ryōtarō Shiba.

Plot
In 1570, Toyotomi Hideyoshi meets a young temple acolyte, "Sakichi", and recruits him into his service after being impressed with his impertinence.  Sakichi grows up and eventually renames himself Ishida Mitsunari, gaining wealth, lands and prestige in his new master's service. Hideyoshi unifies most of Japan and takes the title of taikō, but also grows erratic in his old age: He orders a series of expensive invasions of Korea to expand his holdings but his armies are defeated and most of his vassals are almost bankrupted. In 1595, after he fathers a son, Hideyori, following years of being unable to conceive, Toyotomi orders the execution of his previously appointed heir and his entire family, under the pretext of treason, so his biological son can be his new heir. Dismayed at this unjust act, Mitsunari pleads for mercy, but fails to move Hideyoshi's heart. 

After the maids of one of the condemned women attack Ishida and his men during the execution, Mitsunari is impressed by their loyalty to their lady and spares them, even recruiting one of them, a woman called Hatsume, to serve him as a spy. After the execution, Mitsunari also meets Shima Sakon, a ronin who had caused a disturbance prior to the beheadings and who was once an incredibly respected general. Mitsunari offers Sakon half of his earnings if he'll serve him as a samurai, but Sakon initially turns him down, since he loathes Mitsunari's master, Toyotomi. During dinner with Sakon and his wife, Hanano, Mitsunari convinces Sakon to join him by promising that, after Toyotomi dies, he'll help Toyotomi's son govern the country more fairly and wisely than his father.

Intrigues continue at court as Hideyoshi grows ill and weak. Mitsunari and his longtime friend, Otani Yoshitsugu, correctly suspect that Tokugawa Ieyasu, the wealthiest lord in the country, will conspire to usurp control away from the Toyotomi Clan after Hideyoshi's death. Tokugawa starts secretly conspiring with his vassals, Honda Tadakatsu and Ii Naomasa, to rise against Mitsunari after Hideyoshi's death, since they suspect he'll try to take control of the Regency Council that will govern until young Hideyori comes of age. After Toyotomi vassal Kobayakawa Hideaki is demoted and has most of his lands confiscated by Hideyoshi for poor conduct in Korea; Tokugawa convinces him that Mitsunari has been turning Hideyoshi against him. He also gains the favor of the Seven Spears of Shizugatake, Hideyoshi's greatly respected personal bodyguards, after sparing them punishment following a drunken brawl. Using bribes and espionage, Hatsume tries to keep Mitsunari informed of Tokugawa's actions, but she is hindered by Tokugawa's spymaster, the White Snake, who uses her influence to stop informants in Kyoto from selling information to Hatsume.

In 1598, Hideyoshi succumbs to his illness and Mitsunari orders that his death be covered up until all troops return from Korea, in order to avoid chaos during the retreat. When news of Toyotomi's death is made public and this ruse is revealed, Tokugawa takes it as further proof that Mitsunari intends to take control of the Regency Council. Tokugawa plots to have the Seven Spears bring complaints against Mitsunari to the Regency Council, accusing him of trying to usurp Hideyori, but Mitsunari learns of this through Hatsume and he pre-empts them by having one of his allies bring complaints against the Seven Spears of acting insubordinate during the Korean war. Just as conflict appears inevitable, a temporary truce is established due to the intervention of Maeda Toshiie, a respected lord who is friends with both Tokugawa and Mitsunari.

One year later, Maeda dies and the Seven Spears plot to assassinate Mitsunari, so he is forced to flee back to his castle in Sawayama. Before departing, he professes his love for Hatsume, telling her that he cannot be with her because he is already married, but that she is nonetheless the person he loves most. However, after a mission to secretly deliver messages to a severely-ill Otani, Hatsume is ambushed on the road by assassins sent by the White Snake, is captured and sold into slavery. 

Mitsunari forges an alliance with Tokugawa's old rival, Uesugi Kagekatsu, and both declare war on Tokugawa, accusing him of being a usurper. Uesugi's men invade Tokugawa's home province, forcing him to march against them. In the meantime, Mitsunari's forces try to take hostages out of the families of lords living in Osaka, but one such attempted hostage-taking ends in the entire Hosokawa family killing themselves and setting fire to their home. Guilt-ridden, Mitsunari orders that no more hostages be taken and then he begins to mobilize his army, joined by Otani, Sakon and Kobayakawa, the latter of whom is a double agent for Tokugawa. Elsewhere, Hatsume escapes from her captors and begins to travel towards Sekigahara, anticipating Mitsunari and Tokugawa's armies will meet there.

On October 21st of 1600, battle commences in Sekigahara. Sakon leads a small elite force against Kuroda Nagamasa's Tokugawa vanguard; driving them back but getting shot in the process, which forces him to cede command and retreat to the battlefield clinic which his wife runs. One of Mitsunari's ninja attempts to assassinate Tokugawa at his camp, but he is stopped by White Snake, and both die fighting each other. As the battle is in the balance, a hesitant Kobayakawa is pressured by Tokugawa's emissaries into going through with his pre-planned betrayal of Mitsunari. After the order is given, Kobayakawa tries to rescind it and instead attack Tokugawa, but Tokugawa's emissary prevents him from changing his orders. Kobayakawa's troops turn against Mitsunari's, making a surprise attack against Otani's battalions and killing him in the process. The resulting panic sparks chaos in Mitsunari's army and allows the Tokugawa forces to break their lines and rout them, winning the battle. Mitsunari declines to commit suicide, and instead flees after ensuring that Sakon, Hanano and the wounded from her field hospital have escaped.

Mitsunari spends some time in hiding before eventually surrendering to Tokugawa's troops. While imprisoned, he is visited by a grief-stricken Kobayakawa, who regrets having turned on him. Mitsunari forgives him and tells him to go along with Tokugawa now, since it is too late to save him and thus Kobayakawa should preserve himself. The day prior to Mitsunari's execution, Tokugawa meets with him, but neither man says anything to the other. En route to the site of his execution, Mitsunari sees Hatsume, who has finally found him once more. As he and his captors pass her, she mouthes the motto of his clan to him: "If one gives oneself for all, the world will prosper".

Cast
The Western Army
Junichi Okada as Ishida Mitsunari
Kasumi Arimura as Hatsume
Takehiro Hira as Shima Sakon
Noriko Nakagoshi as Hanano, the wife of Sakon
Masahiro Higashide as Kobayakawa Hideaki
Yasumasa Ōba as Ōtani Yoshitsugu
Akaji Maro as Shimazu Yoshihiro
Masaki Miura as Shimazu Toyohisa
Sho Ikushima as Ukita Hideie
Ikuji Nakamura as Mashita Nagamori
Yoshiaki Tsujimoto as Uesugi Kagekatsu
Kenichi Matsuyama as Naoe Kanetsugu
Mitsu Dan as Myozen
Keisuke Horibe as Yasojima Sukezaemon
Ken Yamamura as Shima Nobukatsu
Seisuke Yamasaki as Mōri Terumoto
Shihō Harumi as Ankokuji Ekei

The Eastern Army
Kōji Yakusho as Tokugawa Ieyasu
Ayumi Ito as Hebishiro/Acha
Yukiya Kitamura as Ii Naomasa
Masato Wada as Kuroda Nagamasa
Takuma Oto'o as Fukushima Masanori
Yōhei Matsukado as Katō Kiyomasa
Chukichi Kubo as Honda Masanobu
Daisuke Amano as Honda Tadakatsu
Haruo Sekiguchi as Hosokawa Tadaoki
Kaito Yoshimura as Matsudaira Tadayoshi
Masakazu Saiga as Ikeda Terumasa
Kazunaga Tsuji as Yagyū Munetoshi
Tasuku Nagaoka as Yagyū Munenori
Shu Nakajima as Akamimi, an Iga ninja

Others
Kenichi Takitō as Toyotomi Hideyoshi
Midoriko Kimura as Kita no mandokoro
Tokuma Nishioka as Maeda Toshiie
Nana Wada as Yodo-dono
Juri Yamamoto as Komahime
Katsumi Kiba as the author/narrator

Reception
Mark Schilling of The Japan Times awarded the film three stars out of five, finding it alternately exhilarating and confusing. Of the early parts of the film, he wrote "the film buries the uninitiated in a blizzard of information about the era's politics and personalities, cutting rapidly from scene to scene at a pace meant to be dazzling, but often ends up dizzying" and found the battle sequence "no doubt faithful to the real thing, but somewhat baffling to watch."

The film made ¥2.4 billion (approximately 21.7 million US dollars) in the 2017 Japanese box office.

Awards

References

External links
 

Japanese historical drama films
2010s historical films
2017 films
Films directed by Masato Harada
Cultural depictions of Tokugawa Ieyasu
Cultural depictions of Toyotomi Hideyoshi
Japanese war drama films